Mohamed Benchouia (born 11 May 1964) is an Algerian football manager.

References

1964 births
Living people
Algerian football managers
ASO Chlef managers
USM Blida managers
MC Saïda managers
CA Batna managers
JSM Skikda managers
Algerian Ligue Professionnelle 1 managers
21st-century Algerian people